The Anglican dioceses of Maseno are the Anglican presence in and around Maseno, the Winam Gulf of Lake Victoria, and the western slopes of Mount Elgon, south-west Kenya; they are part of the Anglican Church of Kenya. The remaining dioceses of the Church area in the areas of Mombasa, of Mount Kenya, and of Nakuru.

Diocese of Maseno South

Three dioceses created from the Anglican Diocese of Mombasa in 1960 took in the westernmost area (Nyanza Province: Maseno), the west-central and north-west area (Rift Valley Province: Nakuru) and the central and north-east parts (Central Province: Fort Hall), leaving Mombasa diocese with the south-west area. Maseno diocese itself first split in 1970, into Maseno South and Maseno North, and the southern diocese retained St Stephen's Pro-Cathedral, Kisumu, while Olang' translated to the northern diocese. Maseno South diocese itself has since been split a further three times: Maseno West (1985), Southern Nyanza (1993), and Maseno East (2016).

Bishops of Maseno
1961–1970: Festo Olang' (became Bishop of Maseno North)
21 December 19651970: Evans Agola (became Bishop of Maseno South)

Bishops of Maseno South
1970–1973: Evans Agola
February 19741994: Henry Okullu
January 19821985: Daniel Omolo, Assistant Bishop (became first Bishop of Maseno West)
January 19901991: Haggai Nyang', Assistant Bishop (became first Bishop of Southern Nyanza)
1994–2018: Mwai Abiero
2018 - Charles Onginjo

Diocese of Maseno North

The first time the Maseno diocese was split, in 1970, the northern portion was erected into the Diocese of Maseno North. Olang', the only diocesan of all Maseno, translated to the new northern See. It was divided in order to make Butere and Mumias dioceses in 1993.

Bishops of Maseno North
1970: Festo Olang' (elected Archbishop of Kenya)
1970–1993: James Mundia
1984–1987: Isaac Manango, Assistant Bishop (became first Bishop of Nambale)
1995–present: Simon Oketch

Diocese of Maseno West

In 1985, the Diocese of Maseno West was carved (on 1 January) from the Maseno South diocese. The diocese itself was split in 1999 to create Bondo diocese.

Bishops of Maseno West
1985–1991: Daniel Omolo (previously Assistant Bishop of Maseno South)
1991–present: Joseph Wasonga

Diocese of Nambale

Nambale diocese was erected from Maseno North in 1987, and was itself sub-divided to erect Katakwa and Bungoma dioceses in 1991 and 1996.

Bishops of Nambale
1987–?: Isaac Manango (previously Assistant Bishop of Maseno North)
Josiah Were
2014–present: Robert Magina

Diocese of Katakwa

The Diocese of Katakwa was carved from the Nambale diocese on 1 January 1991; after a concerted campaign led by, among others, Alexander Muge, Bishop of Eldoret.

Bishops of Katakwa
1991–2007: Eliud Okring
7 January 20072016: Zakayo Epusi
2016–present: John Omuse

Diocese of Southern Nyanza

Divided on 1 January 1993 from the Diocese of Maseno South, the Southern Nyanza diocese has her cathedral at Homa Bay.

Bishops of Southern Nyanza
1991–2002: Haggai Nyang' (previously Assistant Bishop of Maseno South)
2002–present: James Ochiel
2016–present: John Omangi, Bishop suffragan of Kisii

Diocese of Butere

Butere was split off Maseno North in January 1993. The cathedral is at St Luke's, Butere, while there are development plans for a Canon Awori Memorial Cathedral in Butere.

Bishops of Butere
1993–2003: Horace Etemesi
2003–2013: Michael Sande
6 October 2013September 2020: Tim Wambunya
12 September 2021Present: Rose Okeno

Diocese of Mumias

The Diocese of Mumias was erected from Maseno North diocese in January 1993 (the same time as Butere).

Bishops of Mumias
1993–2001: William Shikukule (died in office)
30 June 20022017: Beneah Salala
2017–present: Joseph Wandera

Diocese of Bungoma

By the sub-division of the Diocese of Nambale, Bungoma diocese was created on 1 January 1996.

Bishops of Bungoma
13 October 19962009: Eliud Wabukala (became Primate and Archbishop of All Kenya)
1 November 2009present: George Mechumo

Diocese of Bondo

The Diocese of Bondo in Bondo, Kenya was elected on 1 September 1999 from Maseno West diocese.

Bishops of Bondo
20 February 2000July 2017: Johannes Angela (retired)
July 2017present: David Kodiah
 January 2021present: Emily Onyango, Assistant Bishop

Diocese of Maseno East

The Maseno East diocese is the youngest in the area, having been created from Maseno South on 1 January 2016.

Bishops of Maseno East
June 2016present: Joshua Owiti

References

 
Anglicanism in Kenya
Anglican dioceses established in the 20th century
Anglican dioceses established in the 21st century

1960 establishments in Kenya
1970 establishments in Kenya
1985 establishments in Kenya
1987 establishments in Kenya
1991 establishments in Kenya
1993 establishments in Kenya
1996 establishments in Kenya
1999 establishments in Kenya
2016 establishments in Kenya